Colonel Henry Washington (1615–1664), was an officer in the Royalist army during the English Civil War.

Biography
Washington, baptised 21 March 1615,  was the son of Sir William Washington and Anne, daughter of Sir George Villiers (c. 1550–1605).

Washington fought in the English Civil War and was Governor of Worcester in 1646. He died in March 1664, and was buried at Richmond, Surrey.

Family
Washington married Elizabeth, daughter of Sir John Pakington, 1st Baronet. Elizabeth survived Washington and married Samuel Sandys of Ombersley. Washington and Elizabeth had four daughters who survived him, Mary (died 1681), Cathrine whose married name was Forster, and two others.

Notes

References

External links

1615 births
1664 deaths
Cavaliers